1st Banino or Pervoye Banino is a rural locality in Baninsky Selsoviet Rural Settlement, Fatezhsky District, Kursk Oblast, Russia. Population:

Geography 
The village is located on the Gnilovodchik River (a link tributary of the Usozha in the basin of the Svapa), 109 km from the Russia–Ukraine border, 37 km north-west of Kursk, 4.5 km (15 km by road) north-east of the district center – the town Fatezh, 5 km from the selsoviet center – Chermoshnoy. There are no streets with titles.

 Climate
1st Banino has a warm-summer humid continental climate (Dfb in the Köppen climate classification).

Transport 
1st Banino is located 6 km from the federal route  Crimea Highway as part of the European route E105, 6.5 km from the road of regional importance  (Fatezh – Dmitriyev), on the road of intermunicipal significance  (M2 "Crimea Highway" – 1st Banino), 24.5 km from the nearest railway station Vozy (railway line Oryol – Kursk).

The rural locality is situated 47 km from Kursk Vostochny Airport, 170 km from Belgorod International Airport and 229 km from Voronezh Peter the Great Airport.

References

Notes

Sources

Rural localities in Fatezhsky District